The BMW 3 Series Compact is a car which was produced from 1993 through 2004 by BMW. It is a 3-door hatchback version of the BMW 3 Series and was initially based on the E36 platform, before switching to the E46 platform in 2001.

The launch models were powered by four-cylinder petrol engines, with the range expanded over the years to include a four-cylinder compressed natural gas engine, four-cylinder diesel engines and six-cylinder petrol engines. Unlike most hatchback competitors, the 3 Series Compact uses rear-wheel drive (instead of front-wheel drive).

In 2004, the 3 Series Compact was replaced by the 1 Series. The 3 Series GT, introduced in 2013, is not a successor to the 3 Series Compact, despite also using a hatchback rear opening.

First generation (E36; 1994) 

Launched in 1994, the E36 3 Series Compact (model code E36/5), was BMW's first hatchback since the 2002 Touring model was discontinued in 1974.

From the front bumper to the A-pillar, the E36/5 is identical to the E36 saloon. From the A-pillar rearwards, the E36/5 is unique from others in the E36 range. Although the overall length of the E36/5 is approximately  shorter than the rest of the E36 3 Series range, the length of the wheelbase is the same.

A large sunroof, covered by a folding canvas roof was available from mid-1995. This model was known as either the California Top Edition or the Open Air Edition.

In September 1996 (model year 1997), the 3 Series Compact received a facelift. Changes included revised tail-lights, grille, bumpers and mirrors.

Suspension 
The front suspension uses the E36's MacPherson strut design, while the rear suspension uses a semi-trailing arm from the previous generation E30 models (instead of the Z-Axle multi-link suspension used by the rest of the E36 range). This rear suspension arrangement - which is also used on the Z3 - is more compact and cheaper to produce. Some reviewers believe that this arrangement causes the E36/5's handling to be prone to oversteer.

Interior 
The interior is mostly similar to the E36 saloon models, apart from the folding rear seats and dashboard which shares some elements with the previous generation E30 3 Series.

Models 

* Bivalent drive: The 316g can run either on gasoline or compressed natural gas (CNG).  when running on gasoline.

Prototype models 
M3 Compact 
In 1996, to celebrate the 50th birthday of the German automobile magazine Auto, Motor und Sport, BMW M hand-built one M3 Compact. The car embodied all the technical and optical characteristics of the standard E36 M3, but in the compact body. Quad exhaust tips, Recaro sports seats, four-point seatbelts, an Alcantara steering wheel and gear lever were specific for this model.

North American models 
In North America, the sole model available was the 318ti, initially powered by a DOHC 1.8 litre,  inline-four BMW M42 engine. In 1996, to make the car compliant with OBD-II, the M42 was replaced by the 1.9 litre M44 engine.

The E36 Compact was popular in its home market in Europe, which prompted BMW to market the car to North America in late 1994 (for the 1995 model year). BMW ceased import of the BMW Compact to North America in 1999 after a very short 4-year run due to a combination of poor sales, and BMW's decision to phase out all 4-cylinder vehicles in the United States. The failure of the E36 Compact precluded the E46 Compact's entry into the North American market, and prompted BMW to reconfigure the BMW Compact's successor, the BMW 1 Series, from a liftback to a coupe before attempting to market the car in North America again.

Sales figures 
The total production for 1993 to 1999 (ie excluding 2000, the final year of production) is 371,498.

Second generation (E46/5; 2000)

In 2000, the 3 Series Compact was redesigned using the then-new E46 platform. This updated Compact has the model code E46/5.

The exterior styling has several differences to the rest of the E46 3 Series range, notably the distinctive headlights and tail-lights. Mechanically, the Compact shares many elements with the rest of the E46 range, however the steering rack has a faster ratio.

The E46/5 was not sold in North America as its predecessor didn't prove to be a sales success in that market.

Transmissions 

Transmission options are mostly the same as the equivalent E46 coupe/sedan model. 

From early 2003, the 325ti was available with a 6-speed SMG-II automated manual transmission.

Models

Petrol engines 

* Used instead of the N42 engine in countries where vehicles tax charges favour smaller engines.
† Used instead of the N46 engine in countries where vehicles tax charges favour smaller engines.

Diesel engines

References

Compact
3 Series Compact
Compact cars
Hatchbacks
Cars introduced in 1993
Rear-wheel-drive vehicles
2000s cars